Phestilla sibogae is a species of sea slug, an aeolid nudibranch, a marine gastropod mollusk in the family Trinchesiidae. The species feeds on the hard coral genus Porites.

Distribution
This species was described from Indonesia. It was previously treated as a synonym of Phestilla lugubris but is now considered distinct due to differences in larval development and adult morphology to be a distinct species.

References

External links
 

Trinchesiidae
Gastropods described in 1905
Marine fauna of Southeast Asia
Marine molluscs of Asia
Fauna of Indonesia